US Post Office-Richfield Springs is a historic post office building located at Richfield Springs in Otsego County, New York, United States. It was built in 1941–1942, and is one of a number of post offices in New York State designed by the Office of the Supervising Architect of the Treasury Department, Louis A. Simon.   It is one story, five bay building with a granite clad foundation, brick facades laid in common bond and limestone trim. The roof is surmounted by an octagonal cupola with metal window tracery and a decorative iron weathervane. The building displays Colonial Revival style details.  The interior features an untitled 1942 mural by artist John W. Taylor depicting a local landscape. It is located within the East Main Street Historic District.

It was listed on the National Register of Historic Places in 1989.

References 

Richfield Springs
Government buildings completed in 1942
Colonial Revival architecture in New York (state)
Buildings and structures in Otsego County, New York
1942 establishments in New York (state)
National Register of Historic Places in Otsego County, New York